Legislative elections were held in Mexico on 6 June 2021. Voters elected 500 deputies (300 in single-member constituencies by first-past-the-post, 200 by proportional representation) to sit in the Chamber of Deputies for the 65th Congress.

On 5 December 2020, the National Action Party, the Institutional Revolutionary Party and the Party of the Democratic Revolution announced an electoral alliance, Va por México ("Go For Mexico"). Morena, the Labour Party and the Ecologist Green Party of Mexico formed the Juntos Hacemos Historia  (″Together we make history″) coalition. Both alliances were approved by the National Electoral Institute (INE).

The INE issued a statement on 3 February 2021 saying that it would not be prudent to postpone the election because of the COVID-19 pandemic and doing so could even trigger a constitutional crisis by delaying the opening of the 65th Congress. INE board president Lorenzo Córdova Vianello noted the successful elections in Hidalgo and Coahuila in October 2020.

On 13 April 2021, the INE canceled the registrations of Manuel Guillermo Chapman (Morena), Ana Elizabeth Ayala Leyva, (Juntos Haremos Historia), and Raúl Tadeo Nava (Labor Party) for failure to certify their lack of involvement in gender violence. On June 3, INE warned about possible sanctions on Catholic bishops, in particular Juan Sandoval Íñiguez, for their interference in the elections.

The elections were Mexico's largest in history and were tainted by several political assassinations and the COVID-19 pandemic in Mexico.

Parties 

Two alliances took part: Juntos Hacemos Historia and Va por México.

Two alliances were formed for the 2021 legislative election. Both are partial alliances, running joint candidates in most districts but running individual candidates in others.

On 22 December 2020, PRI, PAN, and PRD announced the electoral alliance Va por México. The alliance initially planned to run together in 180 of the 300 electoral districts, but on 23 December, the last day of registration, announced that they would only run together in 171 districts. On February 15, 2021 the Instituto Nacional Electoral (INE) approved the expansion of the coalition to a total of 219 districts. PRI represents the alliance in 77 districts, PAN in 72, and PRD in 70.

In December 2020 Morena, PT, and PVEM announced an electoral alliance, running together in 150 of the 300 electoral districts. On March 18, 2021 the coalition was expanded to cover 183 districts. The alliance is represented by MORENA in 88 districts, PT in 50, and PVEM in 45.

Mexican law requires political parties to obtain at least 3% of the vote to be registered. Registration allows the party to  postulate candidates and receive subsidies for campaign expenses (MXN $161.9 million or US$8.1 million each in 2021). Based on 2021 PREP results, Progressive Social Networks, Solidarity Encounter Party, and Force for Mexico will lose their registration. RSP, affiliated with teachers′ union leader Elba Esther Gordillo, had 839,000 (1.76%) votes; PES, affiliated with evangelist Hugo Eric Flores, had 296,568 (2.73%) votes; and FM, affiliated with Senator Ricardo Monreal, had 178,000 (2.48%) votes. The parties have the opportunity to reorganize for the next election.

Distribution of electoral districts by coalition

Opinion polls

Controversies

Possibility of post-election protests
Prior Mexican elections have been fraught with accusations of election fraud, this had led to massive protests after the majority of Mexican elections in the past two decades. The 2021 legislative election did not cause protests. In a speech on June 14 , Mexican President Andrés Manuel López Obrador said "We must celebrate it, because we achieved our purpose: to establish in Mexico an authentic, a true democracy."

Political assassinations 
The runup to the 2021 legislative election in Mexico was filled with political assassinations. More than 91 politicians were killed, 14 of them being candidates. This political violence led to the 2021 elections being labeled as the second most deadly election since the year 2000.

Absentee voting
Mexican citizens from eleven states who live overseas can vote electronically or by mail. Most of the elections are for governor, but overseas citizens registered in Mexico City, Jalisco, and Guerrero will be able to vote in state legislative elections.

INE approved a pilot program allowing prison inmates who are held in protective custody in Hermosillo (District 4, Sonora); Villa Comaltitlán, Chiapas; Coatlán del Río (District 4 Jojutla, Morelos); and Buena Vista Tomatlán (District 12 Apatzingán, Michoacán) to vote absentee from May 17–19, 2021. The present order covers only male inmates, but it may be extended to females.

Results
The results were a stalemate. The Morena coalition (Juntos Hacemos Historia) retained their majority in the Chamber of Deputies, but lost a significant number of seats to the opposition coalition (Va por México). The opposition was able to gain enough seats to block Morena from the two-thirds majority required to make constitutional amendments. The Morena coalition won with over 44% of the popular vote. Morena and its allies performed very well in gubernatorial races winning about half of Mexico’s 32 governorships.

Because Morena does not have a super-majority or a majority with Morena alone, there are questions about how that will impact legislative goals. Some say López Obrador might negotiate to bring his policies to fruition. Others say he could attempt to flex his executive muscle and brute force changes by using his powers as president.

The 2021 Mexican legislative election also proved that the opposition performs stronger when they are allied together. With their alliance, the opposition stands a chance at denying Morena a legislative majority or even the presidency in the 2024 elections.

The election had a voter turnout of 52.6% with 48.9 million votes cast, the largest midterm election in Mexican history.

The results of the INE's official quick count were announced around midnight Mexico City time. It reported a voter percentage of around 35% for Morena, with the following approximate results for the other parties: PAN, 19%; PRI, 18%; PRD, 3.5%; Green Ecologist Party, 5%; and the Labor Party, 3%.

See also
2021 Mexican local elections
2021 Mexican gubernatorial elections
2021 in Mexican politics and government
List of elections in 2021
List of political parties in Mexico

References

External links
 Federal Electoral Institute  (in Spanish)

Mexico
Legislative
Legislative elections in Mexico
Mexican legislative election
Election and referendum articles with incomplete results